Helocordulia is a genus of dragonfly in the family Corduliidae. They are commonly known as sundragons.

They are confined to eastern USA and Canada where their habitat is clear streams and lakes with sandy bottoms.

The genus contains only two species:
Helocordulia selysii  – Selys's sundragon
Helocordulia uhleri  – Uhler's sundragon

References

Corduliidae
Anisoptera genera
Taxa named by James George Needham